Ary Christoni de Toledo Piza (born August 22, 1937), commonly known as Ary Toledo, is a Brazilian humorist, singer, lyricist and actor.

Early and personal life 
Toledo was born in 1937 in Martinópolis, São Paulo. He was married to the actress and journalist Marly Marley

Career 
Between 1954 and 1955, he began his career a humorist and satirist, first working at Teatro de Arena de São Paulo. He is also a singer and lyricist; his jokes draw humor from the difference between Brazilians and Portuguese. He has written around 60,000 jokes and describes himself as a "garimpeiro of humor". Music is his hobby.

During the Brazilian military government AI-5 he was imprisoned for his anti-government satire, but was soon freed due to his popularity.

Published works

Books 

 Descobrimento do Brasil (with Chico de Assis)
 Modinha de ser
 Ovos que a galinha pôs
 Tiradentes
 Os Textículos de Ary Toledo (A Anarquia da Filosofia) (2011)

Discography 
 No Fino Da Bossa (1968–1988) RGE FERMATA LP
 Ary Toledo (1970)
 Antologia do Sexo (1979) Copacabana LP
 Pois é (1982) Copacabana LP
 Na Base do Riso Explícito (1985) Copacabana LP
 Ary Toledo Ao vivo (1968) RGE LP
 A Todo Vapor (2008)

Songs 
As well as being a writer of jokes, he has also written satirical songs such as:
 A moda do Zé
 Dona Maroca – song of a libertine cat of Mme Marioca
 Linda Meu Bem
 Mataram meu carneiro – song in which he cries over the death of his sheep
 Melô do pinto
 O Rico e o Pobre – social critique about politics and how the same words have different meanings for the rich and poor
 Rosinha – humorous love-song

See also
Brazilian military government AI-5

References

Bibliography 
 Aurélio Buarque de Holanda: Dicionário da Língua Portuguesa, Rio de Janeiro, Positivo, 2005

External links 
 Official Webpage
 

People from São Paulo (state)
1937 births
Brazilian male actors
Brazilian humorists
Brazilian lyricists
Living people